The City of Orange is a township in Essex County, in the U.S. state of New Jersey. As of the 2020 United States census, the township's population was 34,447, an increase of 4,313 (14.3%) from the 2010 census count of 30,134, which in turn reflected a decline of 2,734 (8.3%) from the 32,868 counted at the 2000 census.

The New Jersey Legislature originally incorporated Orange as a township on November 27, 1806, from parts of Newark Township. Parts of the township were taken on April 14, 1834, to form the now-defunct Clinton Township. On January 31, 1860, Orange was reincorporated as a town. Parts of the town were taken to form South Orange Township (April 1, 1861, now known as Maplewood), Fairmount (March 11, 1862, now part of West Orange), East Orange Township (March 4, 1863) and West Orange Township (April 10, 1863). On April 3, 1872, Orange was reincorporated as a city. In 1982, the city was one of four Essex County municipalities to pass a referendum to become a township, joining 11 municipalities that had already made the change, of what ultimately were more than a dozen Essex County municipalities to reclassify themselves as townships to take advantage of federal revenue sharing policies that allocated townships a greater share of government aid to municipalities on a per capita basis. The city derives its name from William III of England or William IV, Prince of Orange.

Despite the differences in the municipalities' character, Orange, East Orange, South Orange and West Orange are sometimes jointly called The Oranges.

In 2020, the township had New Jersey's 12th-highest property tax rate, with an equalized rate of 4.679% compared to 2.824% in the county as a whole and a statewide average of 2.279%.

History
Orange has its origins in Connecticut's New Haven Colony. In 1666, 30 of New Haven's families traveled by water to found "a town on the Passayak" River. They arrived on territory now encompassing Newark, the Oranges, and several other municipalities. The area was in the northeast portion of a land grant conveyed by King Charles II of England to his brother James, Duke of York. In 1664, James conveyed the land to two proprietors, Lord John Berkeley and Sir George Carteret. Since Carteret had been Royal Governor of the Isle of Jersey, the territory became known as "New Jersey."

Orange was initially part of the city of Newark, but it was originally known as "Newark Mountains". On June 7, 1780, the townspeople of Newark Mountains officially voted to adopt the name Orange. At the time, a significant number of people favored secession from Newark. This did not occur until November 27, 1806, when the territory now encompassing all of the Oranges was finally detached.

On April 13, 1807, the first government was elected, but not until March 13, 1860, was Orange officially incorporated as a city. Immediately, the new city began fragmenting into smaller communities, primarily because of local disputes about the costs of establishing paid police, fire, and street departments. South Orange was organized on January 26, 1861; Fairmount (later to become part of West Orange) on March 11, 1862; East Orange on March 4, 1863; and West Orange (including Fairmount) on March 14, 1863.

Early center of transportation

Orange is on the Newark and Mount-Pleasant Turnpike, the main road from Newark to Morristown, and ultimately to Easton, Pennsylvania. The town became a busy thoroughfare for travelers, and hotels abounded. Initially, the stagecoach was the primary method of transportation. Omnibuses of the Eclipse and the Morris & Newark Lines serviced Orange.

The Morris and Essex Railroad arrived in Orange in November 1836, its first cars drawn by horses. On October 2, 1837, the first steam locomotive appeared, and the horses were, with minor exception, relegated to pasture. The "M&E" later became a part of the Delaware, Lackawanna and Western Railroad (DL&W), which exists today as NJ Transit's Morristown Line.

Trolley cars appeared much later, with the Orange and Newark Horse Car Railroad Company running its first car up Main Street in May 1862. The Orange Crosstown Line, eventually extending from Morris Street, Orange, to Bloomfield, was started in June 1888. (The first electric trolley in the State of New Jersey operated over a section of this line.) Eventually, all the trolleys, and the buses that replaced them, became part of the sprawling Public Service Coordinated Transport System.

Orange became an industrial city early in its history, with the tanning industry expanding rapidly after settlers found growths of hemlock trees that were a source for the tannic acid they needed, leading to the growth of many factories producing shoes and boots.

Orange was once the United States' hat-making capital. The industry can be traced there to 1792. By 1892, 21 firms were engaged in that trade, employing over 3,700 people in plants that produced about 4.8 million hats, which had a combined value in excess of $1 million (equivalent to $ million in ). Several brothers founded the "No-Name Hat Company" in Orange before one of them moved on to make fedoras in Philadelphia under the family name, "Stetson." By 1921, only five hat-making firms were left, many having departed for places such as Norwalk and Danbury, Connecticut. By 1960, all had left.

Beer was a major industry in Orange beginning in the early 1900s, when the three Winter Brothers of Pittsburgh, Pennsylvania, arrived in the city and built the first brewery. The Orange Brewery was constructed in 1901 at a reported cost of $350,000 (equivalent to $ million in ). The production of beer ceased with prohibition in 1920, and after the repeal of the Volstead Act in 1933, the brewery was sold to John F. Trommers of Philadelphia. Trommers brewed beer under that label until 1950, when the concern was again sold to Liebmann Breweries, Incorporated, which bottled Rheingold Beer. Eventually, after passing through several other owners, the plant was closed permanently in 1977.

Other notable firms in Orange were the Monroe Calculating Company, manufacturers of the adding machines of the same name, and the Bates Manufacturing Company, producers of office accessories such as staplers and stampers.

The United States Radium Corporation refined ore and extracted the radium used to make luminous paint for dials and hands of watches and other indicators. Years later, the carcinogenic effects of this material became known, and the polluted site of the factory became a liability for the city.

Famous residents and visitors
Orange has produced such notables as baseball's Monte Irvin and heavyweight boxer Tony Galento. Actor William Bendix lived and worked here for a short while. Presidents, presidential candidates, and governors visited. Orange held major celebrations for its 100th anniversary, and another when it turned 150.

Late 20th century political and social changes

Once a multi-ethnic, economically diverse city, Orange suffered indirectly from the 1967 riots in Newark (even though Newark and Orange do not share a border) and directly from the construction of Interstate 280 through the heart of the downtown area, triggering middle-class "white flight" from aging industrial towns to the new automobile suburbs being built in western Essex County and elsewhere. By the end of the 1970s, Orange had many of the urban ills normally associated with larger cities. However, the city still features many tree-lined streets with well-maintained homes.

In 1982, citizens voted overwhelmingly to change the designation of Orange from a city to a township, thereby making it eligible for federal Revenue Sharing funds. In 1985, the State of New Jersey named Orange as a State Urban Enterprise Zone, creating tax breaks and investment incentives.

Geography
According to the United States Census Bureau, the township had a total area of 2.22 square miles (5.74 km2), including 2.21 square miles (5.73 km2) of land and <0.01 square miles (0.01 km2) of water (0.09%).

The East Branch of the Rahway River travels through Orange.

Orange borders the Essex County municipalities of East Orange, Glen Ridge, Montclair, South Orange and West Orange.

Demographics

2010 census

The Census Bureau's 2006–2010 American Community Survey showed that (in 2010 inflation-adjusted dollars) median household income was $40,818 (with a margin of error of +/− $1,616) and the median family income was $44,645 (+/− $4,033). Males had a median income of $34,986 (+/− $3,168) versus $36,210 (+/− $2,706) for females. The per capita income for the borough was $19,816 (+/− $1,027). About 16.2% of families and 18.1% of the population were below the poverty line, including 24.6% of those under age 18 and 20.6% of those age 65 or over.

2000 census
As of the 2000 United States census there were 32,868 people, 11,885 households, and 7,642 families residing in the township. The population density was 14,903.7 people per square mile (5,742.3/km2). There were 12,665 housing units at an average density of 5,742.8 per square mile (2,212.7/km2). The racial makeup of the township was 13.20% White, 75.10% Black or African American, 0.34% Native American, 1.26% Asian, 0.10% Pacific Islander, 5.21% from other races, and 4.79% from two or more races. Hispanic or Latino of any race were 12.47% of the population.

There were 11,885 households, out of which 33.4% had children under the age of 18 living with them, 30.7% were married couples living together, 26.3% had a female householder with no husband present, and 35.7% were non-families. 30.2% of all households were made up of individuals, and 10.5% had someone living alone who was 65 years of age or older. The average household size was 2.73 and the average family size was 3.38.

In the township the population was spread out, with 27.7% under the age of 18, 10.0% from 18 to 24, 32.2% from 25 to 44, 19.3% from 45 to 64, and 10.8% who were 65 years of age or older. The median age was 32 years. For every 100 females, there were 86.0 males. For every 100 females age 18 and over, there were 79.1 males.

The median income for a household in the township was $35,759, and the median income for a family was $40,852. Males had a median income of $33,442 versus $29,520 for females. The per capita income for the CDP was $16,861. About 15.4% of families and 18.8% of the population were below the poverty line, including 24.6% of those under age 18 and 16.7% of those age 65 or over.

As part of the 2000 Census, 75.10% of Orange's residents identified themselves as being African American, one of the highest percentages of African American people in the United States, and the fourth-highest in New Jersey (behind Lawnside at 93.60%, East Orange at 89.46%, and Irvington at 81.66%) of all places with 1,000 or more residents identifying their ancestry.

Orange has a large Haitian American population, with 11.4% of residents identifying themselves as being of Haitian ancestry, the highest of any municipality in New Jersey and the eighth-highest in the United States.

Although still a small percentage of total residents, Orange and East Orange have the largest concentrations of Guyanese Americans in the country. In the 2000 Census, 2.9% of Orange residents identified as being of Guyanese ancestry. While Queens and Brooklyn had larger populations in terms of raw numbers, Orange and East Orange (with 2.5%) had the highest percentages of people of Guyanese ancestry as a portion of the total population of all places in the United States.

Government

Local government

Orange is governed within the Faulkner Act, formally known as the Optional Municipal Charter Law, under the Mayor-Council form of municipal government. The city is one of 71 (of the 564) municipalities statewide that use this form of government. The governing body is comprised of the directly elected mayor and the seven-member City Council. There are four ward representatives on the city council and three at-large representatives. Councilmembers are elected to serve four-year terms of office in non-partisan elections on a staggered basis with the three at-large seats and the mayor up for election together and the four ward seats up together on an alternating cycle in even-numbered years as part of the May municipal election.

, the Mayor of Orange is Dwayne D. Warren, whose term of office ends June 30, 2024. Members of the City Council are Council President Kerry J. Coley (East Ward, 2026), Council Vice President Tency A. Eason (North Ward, 2026), Quantavia L. Hilbert (West Ward, 2026), Weldon M. Montague III (At-Large, 2024), Clifford Ross (At-Large, 2024), Jamie Summers-Johnson (South Ward, 2022) and Adrienne Wooten (At-Large, 2024).

Federal, state and county representation
The City of Orange Township is in the 10th Congressional District and New Jersey's 34th state legislative district. Until the 2011 reapportionment following the 2010 Census, Orange had been in the 27th state legislative district.

Politics
As of March 2011, there were 14,943 registered voters in Orange, of whom 8,490 (56.8%) were registered as Democrats, 302 (2.0%) as Republicans, and 6,147 (41.1%) as Unaffiliated. There were no voters registered as either Libertarian or as affiliated with the Green Party.

In the 2012 presidential election, Democrat Barack Obama received 96.7% of the vote (9,828 cast), ahead of Republican Mitt Romney with 2.9% (291 votes), and other candidates with 0.4% (42 votes), among the 10,230 ballots cast by the township's 16,243 registered voters (69 ballots were spoiled), for a turnout of 63.0%. In the 2008 presidential election, Obama received 95.5% of the vote (10,001 cast), ahead of Republican John McCain with 3.8% (397 votes) and other candidates with 0.3% (27 votes), among the 10,476 ballots cast by the city's 15,388 registered voters, for a turnout of 68.1%. In the 2004 presidential election, Democrat John Kerry received 89.6% of the vote (8,000 ballots cast), outpolling Republican George W. Bush with 9.1% (811 votes) and other candidates with 0.5% (67 votes), among the 8,931 ballots cast by the city's 14,409 registered voters, for a turnout percentage of 62.0.

In the 2013 gubernatorial election, Democrat Barbara Buono received 85.0% of the vote (3,809 cast), ahead of Republican Chris Christie with 14.4% (643 votes), and other candidates with 0.6% (27 votes), among the 4,560 ballots cast by the township's 16,607 registered voters (81 ballots were spoiled), for a turnout of 27.5%. In the 2009 gubernatorial election, Democrat Jon Corzine received 91.7% of the vote (4,993 ballots cast), ahead of Republican Chris Christie with 5.5% (302 votes), Independent Chris Daggett with 1.4% (74 votes) and other candidates with 0.6% (31 votes), among the 5,442 ballots cast by the city's 14,891 registered voters, yielding a 36.5% turnout.

Emergency services

Fire department

The City of Orange is served by the professional firefighters of the city of Orange Fire Department (OFD). Founded in 1872, the OFD operates out of two fire stations, located at 419 Central Avenue and 257 Washington Street. The firefighting apparatus consists of two fire engines, two quints and a ladder truck.

Education

The Orange Board of Education serves public school students in pre-kindergarten through twelfth grade. The district is one of 31 former Abbott districts statewide that were established pursuant to the decision by the New Jersey Supreme Court in Abbott v. Burke which are now referred to as "SDA Districts" based on the requirement for the state to cover all costs for school building and renovation projects in these districts under the supervision of the New Jersey Schools Development Authority.

As of the 2020–21 school year, the district, comprised of 12 schools, had an enrollment of 5,629 students and 507.5 classroom teachers (on an FTE basis), for a student–teacher ratio of 11.1:1. Schools in the district (with 2020–21) enrollment data from the National Center for Education Statistics) are 
Orange Early Childhood Center (188 students; in Pre-K), 
John Robert Lewis Early Childhood Center (NA; Pre-K), 
Central Elementary School (319; K–2), 
Cleveland Street School (303; K–7), 
Forest Street Community School (410; Pre-K–7), 
Heywood Avenue School (355; Pre-K–7), 
Lincoln Avenue School (708; K–7), 
Oakwood Avenue Community School (425; Pre-K–7), 
Park Avenue School (569; K–7), 
Rosa Parks Central Community School (999; Grades 3–7) formerly Main Street School and Central School), 
Scholars Academy (NA), 
Orange Preparatory Academy (679; 8–9, formerly Orange Middle School), 
Orange High School (840; 10–12) and 
STEM Innovation Academy of the Oranges (160; 9–12).

The Orange Public Library collection contains 200,000 volumes and circulates 43,000 items annually. Built as the Stickler Memorial Library, the imposing structure designed by McKim, Mead, and White opened in 1901.

Economy

Portions of the city are part of an Urban Enterprise Zone (UEZ), one of 32 zones covering 37 municipalities statewide. Orange was selected in 1983 as one of the initial group of 10 zones chosen to participate in the program. In addition to other benefits to encourage employment and investment within the Zone, shoppers can take advantage of a reduced 3.3125% sales tax rate (half of the % rate charged statewide) at eligible merchants. Established in November 1992, the city's Urban Enterprise Zone status expires in November 2023.

Transportation

Roads and highways

Interstate 280 is the most significant highway serving the city, traversing along an east-west alignment from the border with West Orange to the East Orange city line. The only other significant roadway serving Orange is County Route 508, which follows Central Avenue. Principal local roads include Valley Street, Lincoln Avenue, Scotland Road and Highland Avenue.

Public transportation
The Orange and Highland Avenue stations provide NJ Transit train service along the Morris & Essex Lines (formerly Erie Lackawanna Railway). Service is available via the Kearny Connection to Secaucus Junction and Penn Station in Midtown Manhattan and to Hoboken Terminal. Passengers can transfer at Newark Broad Street or Summit station to reach the other destination if necessary.

NJ Transit buses in Orange include the 21, 24, 34, 41, 44, 71, 73 and 79 routes providing service to Newark and local service on the 92 and 97 routes.

Notable people

People who were born in, residents of, or otherwise closely associated with Orange include:

 Anthony Accetturo (born 1938), former caporegime and leader of the New Jersey faction of the Lucchese crime family, The Jersey Crew
 Robert Adams (born 1937), photographer who has focused on the changing landscape of the American West
 Stephanie Adams (1970–2018), model and author who was the November 1992 Playboy Playmate
 Walter G. Alexander (1880–1953), first African American member of the New Jersey Legislature
 Jay Alford (born 1983), defensive tackle for the Oakland Raiders drafted in the third round of the 2007 NFL Draft (81st overall)
 Peter Allgeier, served as U.S. Deputy Trade Representative from May 2001 until August 2009
 George Armstrong (1924–1993), catcher who played eight MLB games in 1946 with the Philadelphia Athletics
 Tom Auth (born 1968), rower who competed at the 1996 Summer Olympics and the 2000 Summer Olympics
 Bobby Bandiera (born 1953), rock guitarist, singer and songwriter who was lead guitarist for Southside Johnny and the Asbury Jukes
 James J. Barry Jr. (born 1946), politician who served in the New Jersey General Assembly and as Director of the New Jersey Division of Consumer Affairs
 Dan Baum (1956–2020), journalist and author who wrote for The Wall Street Journal, The New Yorker, Rolling Stone, Wired, Playboy, and The New York Times Magazine, among other publications
 Stephen J. Benkovic (born 1938), chemist
 Douglas J. Bennet (1938–2018), political official who served as the fifteenth president of Wesleyan University
 John L. Blake (1831–1899), represented New Jersey's 6th congressional district from 1879 to 1881
 Ken Blanchard (born 1939), author, whose works include The One Minute Manager
 Thomas Aloysius Boland (1896–1979), prelate of the Roman Catholic Church who was Archbishop of Newark from 1952 to 1974
 Cory Boyd (born 1985), former starting tailback for the University of South Carolina and drafted by the Tampa Bay Buccaneers in the 7th round (238th pick overall) of the 2008 NFL Draft
 Sandra Boynton (born 1953), humorist, songwriter, director, music producer, children's author and illustrator
 Garrett Brown Jr. (born 1943), former United States District Judge and later the Chief Judge of the United States District Court for the District of New Jersey
 Lesley Bush (born 1947), diver who represented the United States at the 1964 Summer Olympics in Tokyo, where she received a gold medal in platform diving
 Samuel P. Bush (1863–1948), industrialist and patriarch of the Bush political family
 Bisa Butler (born 1973), fiber artist known for her quilted portraits and designs celebrating black life
 Peter Cain (1959–1997), artist who is best known for his meticulously executed paintings and drawings of surreal and aberrant versions of automobiles
 Ernest Trow Carter (1866–1953), organist and composer who won the Bispham Award
 Herbert S. Carter (1869–1927), physician and writer
 Dennis M. Cavanaugh (born 1947), retired United States district judge of the United States District Court for the District of New Jersey
 Robert Hett Chapman (1771–1833), Presbyterian minister and missionary and the second president of the University of North Carolina at Chapel Hill
 Evans Clark (1888–1970), writer strongly committed to first to Communist and Socialist causes and then liberal socio-economic issues
 Harold L. Colburn Jr. (1925–2012), physician and politician who served in the New Jersey General Assembly representing the 8th Legislative District from 1984 to 1995
 Richard Codey (born 1946), politician who served in the New Jersey Legislature since 1974 and was the 53rd Governor of New Jersey, from 2004 to 2006
 Steven A. Cohen (born 1953), academic who has taught public management and environmental policy at Columbia University since 1981
 Corinne Alsop Cole (1886–1971), politician who served two terms as a member of the Connecticut House of Representatives
 Samuel Colgate (1822–1897), manufacturer and philanthropist, who headed the soap company that is now part of Colgate-Palmolive and was a benefactor of Colgate University
 John Condit (1755–1834), United States Representative and Senator from New Jersey
 Silas Condit (1778–1861), represented New Jersey in the United States House of Representatives from 1831 to 1833
 Peter Cortes (born 1947), rower who competed in the men's quadruple sculls event at the 1976 Summer Olympics
 Bob Cottingham (born 1966), Olympic fencer who competed in the sabre events at the 1988 and 1992 Summer Olympics
 John Crotty (born 1969), former NBA basketball player for the Cleveland Cavaliers, Portland Trail Blazers and Denver Nuggets
 Bobby Czyz (born 1962), champion prizefighter
 Brian E. Daley (born 1940), professor of theology who received the Ratzinger Prize in 2012
 William Howe Davis (1904–1982), politician who served as Mayor of Orange for 12 years and as the Director of the New Jersey Division of Alcoholic Beverage Control during the Administration of Governor Robert B. Meyner
 Pete D'Alonzo (1929–2001), football player who played two seasons with the Detroit Lions of the NFL
 Constance Adams DeMille (1874–1960), actress and wife of director Cecil B. DeMille
 Wayne Dickens, former American football player and coach who was head football coach at Kentucky State University from 2009 to 2012 and The College of New Jersey from 2013 to 2015
 S. Kip Farrington (1904–1983), sport fisherman and journalist
 Gail Fisher (1935–2000), actress best known for her role on Mannix
 Buddy Fortunato (born 1946), newspaper publisher and politician who served four terms in the New Jersey General Assembly
 Charles N. Fowler (1852–1932), represented 5th congressional district in the United States House of Representatives from 1895 to 1911
 Tony Galento (1910–1979), heavyweight boxer
 Robert E. Grady (born 1959), venture capitalist and investment banker
 Al Harrington (born 1980), professional basketball player for the NBA's Denver Nuggets, Golden State Warriors and Washington Wizards
 Edward V. Hartford (1870–1922), founder and President of the Hartford Suspension Company who perfected the automobile shock absorber
 George Huntington Hartford (1833–1917), Mayor from 1878 to 1890 and owner of the Great Atlantic and Pacific Tea Company, the country's largest food retailer at the time of his death
 Beatrice Hicks (1919–1979), founder of the Society of Women Engineers in 1950
 Cleo Hill (1938–2015), professional basketball player who played one season in the NBA for the St. Louis Hawks
 Dulé Hill (born 1975), actor, known for starring in TV series Psych and The West Wing
 Monte Irvin (1919–2016), former Negro leagues and MLB outfielder, MLB executive and member of the Baseball Hall of Fame
 Bobby M. Jones (born 1972), pitcher who played for the New York Mets during his MLB career
 Mark Kelly (born 1964), astronaut who first went into space as the pilot for STS-108 Endeavour (December 5–17, 2001), and returned to space with STS-121 in 2006 as the pilot; His twin brother, Scott Kelly, is also in the Astronaut Corps
 Thomas Kiernan (1933-2003), writer who was the author of a biographies that featured figures including Laurence Olivier, Jane Fonda, John Steinbeck, and Yasser Arafat.
 Jay Lynch (1945–2017), cartoonist best known for his comic strip Nard n' Pat
 Phyllis Mangina (born 1959), college basketball coach who is currently an assistant women's basketball coach at Saint Peter's
 William F. Marsh (1916–1995), politician who served in the California State Assembly for the 42nd district from 1953 to 1959
 John B. Mason (1858–1919), stage actor
 Lowell Mason (1792–1872), composer of over 1600 hymn tunes, including his arrangement of "Joy to the World" 
 Elmer Matthews (1927–2015), lawyer and politician who served three terms in the New Jersey General Assembly
 George McClellan (1826–1885), American Civil War general and later Governor of New Jersey, died here
 Donald W. McGowan (1899–1967), United States Army Major General and Chief of the National Guard Bureau
 James T. McHugh (1932–2000), prelate of the Roman Catholic Church who served as Bishop of Camden (1989–1998) and Bishop of Rockville Centre (2000)
 John Milnor (born 1931), mathematician known for his work in differential topology, K-theory and dynamical systems and recipient of the Fields Medal, Wolf Prize, and Abel Prize
 Daniel F. Minahan (1877–1947), served as mayor of Orange from May 1914 until August 1919, and represented New Jersey's 6th congressional district from 1919 to 1921 and again from 1923 to 1925
 Gordon Allen Newkirk Jr. (1928–1985), astrophysicist best known for his research on the solar corona
 Yosh Nijman (born 1995), American football offensive tackle for the Green Bay Packers of the National Football League
 Col. Henry Steel Olcott (1832–1907), founder and first president of the Theosophical Society, first well-known person of European ancestry to make a formal conversion to Buddhism, helped create a Buddhist renaissance, assisted in designing the Buddhist flag, a national hero of Sri Lanka
 Chris Petrucelli (born 1962), soccer manager who is currently the head coach of the Chicago Red Stars in the National Women's Soccer League
 Joel A. Pisano (1949–2021), United States district judge of the United States District Court for the District of New Jersey from 2000 to 2001
 Carolyn Plaskett (1917–2001), American-born illustrator, international scholar and former first lady of Barbados
 Daniel Quillen (1940–2011), mathematician known for being the "prime architect" of higher algebraic K-theory and recipient of the Fields Medal
 Jim Ringo (1931–2007), NFL player for the Green Bay Packers and Philadelphia Eagles, member of the Pro Football Hall of Fame
 Stuart Risch, United States Army major general who serves as the Deputy Judge Advocate General of the United States Army
 Jack Robinson (1921–2000), professional baseball pitcher whose MLB career consisted of three games played for the Boston Red Sox in 1949
 Robert E. Rose (1939–2022), politician who served as the 26th Lieutenant Governor of Nevada, from 1975 to 1979
 Johnny Sansone (born 1957), electric blues singer, songwriter, harmonicist, accordionist, guitarist and piano player
 Dick Savitt (born 1927), tennis player who reached a ranking of No. 2 in the world
 Roy Scheider (1932–2008), actor known for films such as Jaws, All That Jazz and The French Connection
 Morton Schindel (1918–2016), educator, producer, and founder of Weston Woods Studios, which specializes in adapting children's books into animated films
 Peter Shapiro (born 1952), financial services executive and former politician who was the youngest person ever elected to the New Jersey General Assembly and went on to serve as Essex County Executive
 John M. Smith (1935–2019), prelate of the Roman Catholic Church, who served as the ninth Bishop of Trenton, from 1997 to 2010
 Leigh Howard Stevens (born 1953), marimba artist best known for developing, codifying and promoting the Stevens technique
 Lucy Stone (1818–1893), abolitionist and suffragist who staged a tax protest in 1857 over her lack of representation as a homeowner in Orange
 Salamishah Tillet (born 1975), feminist activist, scholar and writer
 Robert F. Titus (born 1926), United States Air Force brigadier general and fighter pilot
 George Tully (1904–1980), NFL player with the Frankford Yellow Jackets
 Cornelius Clarkson Vermeule III (1925–2008), scholar of ancient art and curator of classical art at the Museum of Fine Arts, Boston from 1957 to 1996
 Dionne Warwick (born 1940), singer, actress, television host, and former Goodwill Ambassador for the UN's Food and Agriculture Organization
 Khalil Wheeler-Weaver (born 1996), serial killer

Points of interest
 Orange Reservoir
 Rosedale Cemetery
 St. Johns Catholic Cemetery
 St. Johns Church
 Columbus Hall

See also

 Radium Girls, female factory workers who contracted radiation poisoning from painting watch dials with self-luminous paint

References

External links

 City of Orange Township website
 Orange Board of Education
 
 School Data for the Orange Board of Education, National Center for Education Statistics
 Citizens for Responsible Government website 

 
1806 establishments in New Jersey
Cities in Essex County, New Jersey
Faulkner Act (mayor–council)
New Jersey Urban Enterprise Zones
Populated places established in 1806
The Oranges, New Jersey